Maryse Pelletier (born November 20, 1946) is a Canadian actress and award-winning writer living in Quebec.

She was born in Cabano and received a BA from the Université de Moncton. She went on to study French, American and English literature at the Université Laval and theatre at the Conservatoire d'art dramatique de Montréal. Pelletier wrote scripts for a number of Radio-Canada television series for youth, including Traboulidon and Iniminimagimo; these series received Genie Awards for children's programming. She also contributed to the series  and Les frimousses, as well as a series on illiteracy Graffiti.

Selected works

Plays 
 Du poil aux pattes comme les CWACS (1982)

Novels 
 La Musique des choses (1998), received the Médaille de la Culture française awarded by 
 Une vie en éclats (1997), finalist for a Governor General's Prize
 Un couteau sur la neige, received the

References

External links 
 

1946 births
Living people
Writers from Quebec
Canadian children's writers in French
Governor General's Award-winning dramatists
Canadian women screenwriters
Canadian film actresses
Canadian novelists in French
Canadian women novelists
French Quebecers
Canadian dramatists and playwrights in French
Canadian women dramatists and playwrights
Canadian theatre directors
20th-century Canadian dramatists and playwrights
20th-century Canadian novelists
21st-century Canadian novelists
21st-century Canadian women writers
20th-century Canadian women writers
Canadian women children's writers